This page is a list of mayors of the city of Limerick, Ireland.

List

Provosts prior to first charter
1195: John Spafford
1196: Alexander Barrett
1197: Henry Troy

Mayors

1899–2014

Mayor of the City and County of Limerick

References

 
Limerick
Lists of political office-holders in the Republic of Ireland
Mayors